Central Leather Research Institute or CLRI is the world's largest leather research institute in terms of research papers and patents. The institute located in Chennai, Tamil Nadu was founded on 24 April 1948 as a constituent laboratory under the Council of Scientific and Industrial Research.

History 
Soon after India attained independence in 1947, the first government of the country led by Jawaharlal Nehru focused on industrialisation. As a part of that, several research laboratories and institutes, such as National Physical Laboratory in New Delhi, National Chemical Laboratory in Pune, National Metallurgical Laboratory in Jamshedpur, Fuel Research Institute in Dhanbad, Central Glass and Ceramic Research Institute in Kolkata, were set up across the country. On 24 April 1948, the then Central Minister of Industry and Supply Dr. Syama Prasad Mookerjee laid the foundation stone in the Guindy region of Chennai. Madras State awarded  to the Council of Scientific and Industrial Research and  towards expenses for levelling the land and making it suitable for building construction.

Activities 
The objective of the institute was to deal with all aspects of the leather industry. It carries out research and development in areas such as adapted preservation methods for new hides and skins, improvement of existing leather with respect to shrinkage and color fastness, tanning and finishing techniques, control of environmental pollution, and product design and development of garments, shoes and other articles. The institute also offers technical assistance through training courses on design development, sample making and fabrication, consultancy, preparation of feasibility reports, quality control, among various other activities.

The institute houses departments such as Chemical and Physical Sciences, Biological Sciences, Engineering Sciences and Information Sciences. Besides this, the institute has four regional extension centers in Ahmedabad, Jalandhar, Kanpur and Kolkata.

Milestones 

In 2003, the institute came up with a biological dressing for burn patients that helps in healing second and third degree burns faster and more effectively. In 2004, the institute tied up with National Institute of Fashion Technology to offer professional educational programmes specifically for designing footwear and leather products. In the same year, the institute took up a pilot activity to produce biodiesel from rice bran oil. In 2014 CLRI Scientists launched website to conveniently share real research problems and solutions in research.

Notable people from the institute 
 G. N. Ramachandran developed a triple-helical model of collagen using samples provided by the institute during his research in 1954. He was later awarded the 1999 Ewald Prize for his contributions.
 Thirumalachari Ramasami, a former director of the institute, was a renowned chemist. For his contributions, he was awarded the Shanti Swarup Bhatnagar Award and the Padma Shri. He is awarded Padma Bhushan in 2014
 Narayanan Chandrakumar, chemical physicist, Shanti Swarup Bhatnagar laureate

References

External links

Indian leather industry
Research institutes established in 1948
Council of Scientific and Industrial Research
Research institutes in Chennai
1948 establishments in India
Research institutes in Tamil Nadu
Education in Chennai
Colleges affiliated to University of Madras